Carrbridge railway station serves the village of Carrbridge, Highland, Scotland.

History 

The station was built with a passing loop on the otherwise single track railway, a signal box (automatic token-exchange apparatus was used) and several sidings on the north side of the line.

The station building is thought to be by the architect William Roberts, dating from 1898. A camping coach was positioned here by the Scottish Region from 1954 to 1965.

Accidents and incidents 
There have been two accidents at Carrbridge, one in 1914 and another in 2010.

1914 bridge collapse 

On the afternoon of 18 June 1914, a tremendous thunderstorm struck the mountains to the north of the Highland Main Line. The road bridge carrying the road from Carrbridge to Inverness across the Baddengorm Burn was swept away, while further down the valley the burn entered a narrow gorge, crossed by the railway by means of a narrow arch span of only . The water was at rail level when the six-carriage 11:50 Perth to Inverness train, 9 minutes late leaving Carrbridge Station at 15:24, crossed the bridge. The first two carriages reached the other side but the bridge then gave way, its foundations having been undermined by a vortex of water. The third carriage was left on the north bank of the burn but the next was plunged into the torrent which soon demolished the carriage, drowning five passengers; remarkably four survived.

The enquiry laid no blame on the designers of the bridge as they could not have foreseen such a volume and force of water, which had never before occurred in the area.  The bridge was rebuilt with a longer, concrete, span.

2010 freight train derailment 

On 4 January 2010, a freight train from Inverness to Grangemouth, hauled by a DB Schenker Class 66 for Stobart Rail, derailed on the 1 in 60 (1.67%) gradient down from Slochd Summit at the run out or trap points at the northern end of the station, and ran down an embankment. The driver and technician on the train suffered minor injuries. The line was not reopened until 13 January.

The RAIB report found the cause was found to be snow and ice that worked its way into the space between the wheels' brake blocks. This may have also interfered with other parts of the brake mechanisms on the freight wagons. It was also found that the way the driver performed running brake tests while on the trip contributed to the outcome. Other possible contributing factors were that ploughed snow may have been allowed to accumulate too close to the tracks, thus the train passing these snowbanks at speed may have pulled snow into the brake mechanisms.

Facilities 
The station has a car park, with bike racks, but is not permanently staffed. Flowering shrubs on the platforms are tended by volunteers as part of an 'adopt a station' initiative. Platform 1 has a specific waiting shelter, whilst passengers on platform 2 have to make do with the station buildings. Both platforms also have benches, whilst platform 2 also has a help point. Only platform 2 has step-free access - platform 1 can only be reached via the footbridge. As there are no facilities to purchase tickets, passengers must buy one in advance, or from the guard on the train.

Platform layout 

Passenger volume 

The statistics cover twelve month periods that start in April.

Services 

References

Bibliography

External links 

 Video footage of the station on YouTube

Railway stations in Highland (council area)
Railway stations served by ScotRail
Railway stations served by London North Eastern Railway
Railway stations in Great Britain opened in 1892
Former Highland Railway stations
Listed railway stations in Scotland
Category B listed buildings in Highland (council area)
Accidents and incidents involving Highland Railway
1914 disasters in the United Kingdom
Railway stations served by Caledonian Sleeper